The Coal House in Williamson, West Virginia is a unique building built of coal masonry.  The bituminous coal was quarried as blocks and dressed as stone using 65 tons of coal from the nearby Winifrede Seam. At the time of its construction it was the only coal building in West Virginia.  The house was designed by architect Hassel T. Hicks of Welch, West Virginia and supervised by David M. Goode.  The coal masonry was varnished for weather-resistance.  Located adjacent to the Mingo County Courthouse, it houses the Tug Valley Chamber of Commerce.

The building's construction in 1933 was organized as a publicity stunt by O. W. Evans of the Norfolk and Western Railway, who wished to create a symbol of the "Billion Dollar Coalfield" centered on Williamson. While it is known as the "Coal House", it has never been a residence.

West Virginia's second coal house was built in 1959 in Lewisburg, West Virginia.

On October 11, 2010, the Coal House caught fire. There was extensive damage to the inside of the building and minimal damage to the outside structure.  Following $200,000 of restoration work the Coal House was reopened in September 2011.

References

External links

 Tug Valley Chamber of Commerce

Buildings and structures completed in 1933
Buildings and structures in Mingo County, West Virginia
Coal mining in Appalachia
National Register of Historic Places in Mingo County, West Virginia
Norfolk and Western Railway
Novelty buildings in West Virginia
Roadside attractions in West Virginia
Vernacular architecture in West Virginia
Tourist attractions in Mingo County, West Virginia
1933 establishments in West Virginia
Publicity stunts